Talukder Md.Younus (তালুকদার মোঃ ইউনুস) is a Bangladesh Awami League politician and the incumbent Member of Parliament from Barisal-2.

Early life
Yunus was born on 4 May 1952. He completed his undergraduate with a B.A. and a law degree.

Career
Yunus was elected to Parliament on 5 January 2014 from Barisal-2 as a Bangladesh Awami League candidate.

References

Awami League politicians
Living people
1952 births
10th Jatiya Sangsad members